Drama is the ninth studio album by English musical duo Bananarama, released on 14 November 2005 by A&G Records. It features eleven newly recorded tracks, along with a remix of their 1986 single "Venus" (done by Soft Cell's Marc Almond) and a 2005 remix of their 1982 single "Really Saying Something", an underground bootleg club hit produced by Solasso.

Drama is a comeback of sorts for Bananarama members Keren Woodward and Sara Dallin and is their first album to be released in their native UK since 1993. The album's first single "Move in My Direction" debuted on the UK Singles Chart at number 14, also becoming their first UK top-40 entry since 1993. The second single, "Look on the Floor (Hypnotic Tango)", also reached the UK top 40, and climbed to number two on the US Hot Dance Club Play chart as an import, becoming Bananarama's biggest US dancefloor hit since "Venus" two decades earlier.

The album mostly incorporates dance-pop and Eurodance musical styles, with some synth-pop elements. Drama charted at a number 169 on the UK Albums Chart. It was later released in the United States (both in retail stores and as digital downloads) in 2006, peaking at number 21 on Billboards Top Electronic Albums chart.

Track listing
Original Edition
 "Move in My Direction" – 3:20 (S. Dallin, K. Woodward, D. Clewett, I. Lisinski)
 "Look on the Floor (Hypnotic Tango)" – 3:26 (S. Dallin, K. Woodward, H. Korpi, M. Wollo, M. Malavasi, S. Micheli)
 "Waterfall" – 4:18 (S. Dallin, K. Woodward, H. Korpi, M. Wollo)
 "Frequency" – 3:30 (S. Dallin, K. Woodward, L. Guest, B. Walker)
 "Feel for You" – 3:28 (S. Dallin, K. Woodward, I. Masterson, T. Ronald)
 "Don't Step on My Groove" – 3:06 (S. Dallin, K. Woodward, H. Korpi, M. Wollo)
 "Middle of Nowhere" – 3:46 (S. Dallin, K. Woodward, B. Higgins)
 "I Love the Way" – 4:18 (S. Dallin, K. Woodward, D. Masters)
 "Lovebite" – 3:32 (S. Dallin, K. Woodward, H. Korpi, M. Wollo)
 "Rules of Attraction" – 3:16 (S. Dallin, K. Woodward, H. Korpi, M. Wollo)
 "Your Love Is Like a Drug" – 4:40 (S. Dallin, I. Masterson, T. Ronald)
 "Venus" (Marc Almond's Hi-NRG Showgirls Mix) – 6:04 (R. V. Leeuwen)
 "Really Saying Something" (Solasso Mix) – 5:58 (N. Whitfield, W. Stevenson, E. Holland, Jr)

Taiwanese Edition

CD:
 "Move in My Direction" – 3:20
 "Look on the Floor (Hypnotic Tango)" – 3:26
 "Waterfall" – 4:18
 "Frequency" – 3:30
 "Feel for You" – 3:28
 "Don't Step on My Groove" – 3:06
 "Middle of Nowhere" – 3:46
 "I Love the Way" – 4:18
 "Lovebite" – 3:32
 "Rules of Attraction" – 3:16
 "Your Love Is Like a Drug" – 4:40
 "Venus" (Marc Almond's Hi-NRG Showgirls Mix) – 6:04
 "Really Saying Something" (Solasso Mix) – 5:58
"Move in My Direction" (The Lovefreekz Radio Edit) – 3:28
"Look on the Floor (Hypnotic Tango)" (Angel City Short Remix) – 2:57
DVD (NTSC/Region-3):
 "Move in My Direction" – 3:20
 "Look on the Floor (Hypnotic Tango)" – 3:26

Singaporean Edition
 "Move in My Direction" – 3:20
 "Look on the Floor (Hypnotic Tango)" (Angel City Short Remix) – 2:57
 "Waterfall" — 4:18)
 "Frequency" – 3:30
 "Feel for You" – 3:28
 "Don't Step on My Groove" – 3:06
 "Middle of Nowhere" – 3:46
 "I Love the Way" – 4:18
 "Lovebite" – 3:32
 "Rules of Attraction" – 3:16
 "Your Love Is Like a Drug" – 4:40
 "Venus" (Marc Almond's Hi NRG Showgirls mix) – 6:04
 "Really Saying Something" (Solasso Mix) – 5:58
 "Look on the Floor (Hypnotic Tango)" – 3:26
 "Move in My Direction" (Bobby Blanco and Miki Moto Vocal Mix) – 8:06
 "Move in My Direction" (Angel City Mix) – 6:52

Unreleased songs and demos
"Be My Lover Tonite"
"One Way Street"
Written by Neil Tennant and Chris Lowe aka Pet Shop Boys as confirmed in their official publication Literally
"Falling"
"Better with You"

Personnel
Bananarama
Sara Dallin – Vocals
Keren Woodward – Vocals
Siobhan Fahey – Vocals on "Really Saying Something" (Solasso Mix)

Additional personnel
Matt Curtis – Sleeve Design
Mark Bond – Photography

Producers
Mute 8
Korpi and BlackCell
Leigh Guest
Ian Masterson and Terry Ronald

Additional production
Jeremy Wheatley and Brio Taliaferro for 365 Artists

Engineers
Ian Masterson on "Feel for You"
Kinky Roland and Ben Wood on "Venus" (Marc Almond's Hi NRG Showgirls Mix)

Guitars
L. Dukes and R. Mayes on "Frequency"
Joe Holweger on "I Love the Way"

Bass
Joe Holweger on "I Love the Way"

Additional vocals
Mitch Stevens on "Middle of Nowhere" and "I Love the Way"

Mixers
Ian Masterson and Terry Ronald for Thriller Jill
Jeremy Wheatley for 365 Artists at Twenty-one Studios, London
Niklas Flyckt at Khabang Studios
Marten Eriksson at Cosmo Studio, Stockholm
Solasso on "Really Saying Something"

Mastered by
Naweed Ahmed at Whitfield Street Studios
Dick Beetham at 360 Mastering, London

Published by
Copyright Control/Murlyn Songs AB-Universal Music Publishing/Rondor Music/Warner Chappell

Programming and keyboards
Leigh Guest on "Frequency"
Ian Masterson on "Feel for You", "Middle of Nowhere" and "I Love the Way"

Recorded at
Strongroom and Thriller Jills, London ("Middle of Nowhere", "I Love the Way" and "Your Love Is Like a Drug")

Charts

References

2005 albums
Bananarama albums